The Helena National Guard Armory is a historic armory building at 511 Miller Street in Helena, Arkansas.  It is a single story brick and masonry structure, built in 1936-37 using Works Progress Administration funds to house the Battery G of the 206th Coastal Artillery.  The building's main facade as strong Art Deco styling, with its predominantly brick facing topped by concrete courses, and a strong vertical emphasis achieved by two towers and four pilasters on a pointed-arch roofline.  The building housed a variety of military companies between its opening and its closure in 1978.

The building was listed on the National Register of Historic Places in 2007.  It now serves as a community center.

See also
National Register of Historic Places listings in Phillips County, Arkansas

References

Art Deco architecture in Arkansas
Buildings and structures completed in 1937
Buildings and structures in Phillips County, Arkansas
Armories in Arkansas
Armories on the National Register of Historic Places
National Register of Historic Places in Phillips County, Arkansas
Military facilities on the National Register of Historic Places in Arkansas